Charles Dechamps (13 September 1882 – 25 September 1959) was a French stage and film actor. He married the comedian Fernande Albany on 19 November 1925. He died in 1959, and was buried at cimetière du Père-Lachaise.

Filmography 

 1909: Les Petits pieds de Berthe 
 1909: Fourberie conjugale 
 1909: Mariage à l'espagnole by Michel Carré
 1910: Au temps des grisettes by Georges Denola
 1911: L'Anniversaire de Mademoiselle Félicité by Georges Denola
 1911: Clémence d'Isabeau, la princesse d'Héristal by Georges Denola
 1911: Frisette, blanchisseuse de fin by Georges Denola
 1911: Mimi Pinson by Georges Denola
 1911: Galathée by Georges Denola
 1911: Moderne Galathée by Daniel Riche
 1911: L'Homme de peine by Michel Carré
 1911: Deux Filles d'Espagne by Maurice Denécheau
 1912: Nini l'assommeur by Maurice Bernhardt
 1912: La Bohème by Albert Capellani
 1912: La Sonate du diable by René Leprince
 1912: La Porteuse de pain by Georges Denola
 1913: L'Usurier by Camille de Morlhon
 1914: Le Nid by Léon Poirier
 1918: La Faute d'orthographe by Jacques Feyder
 1918: Frères de Maurice Remon
 1923: The Bread Peddler by René Le Somptier
 1923: Château historique by Henri Desfontaines
 1931: Caught in the Act by Hanns Schwarz and Georges Tréville
 1932: Companion Wanted by Joe May
 1932: Pour un sou d'amour by Jean Grémillon
 1932:  by Georges Lacombe
 1932: Un peu d'amour by Hans Steinhoff
 1933: Gonzague ou l'accordeur (short film) by Jean Grémillon
 1933: Le Fakir du grand hôtel by Pierre Billon
 1933: Ève cherche un père by Mario Bonnard
 1933: Three Lucky Fools by Mario Bonnard
 1933: Toi que j'adore by Geza von Bolvary and Albert Valentin
 1933: All for Love by Joe May and Henri-Georges Clouzot
 1933: Trois hommes en habit by Mario Bonnard
 1933: Vive la compagnie by Claude Moulins
 1934: Si j'étais le patron by Richard Pottier : Sainclair 
 1934: Un train dans la nuit by René Hervil
 1934: Le Coup du parapluie (short film) by Victor de Fast
 1935: Adémaï au Moyen Âge by Jean de Marguenat
 1935: J'aime toutes les femmes by Karel Lamač
 1935: Mon cœur t'appelle by Carmine Gallone and Serge Veber
 1935: A Rare Bird by Richard Pottier
 1936: Monsieur est saisi (short film) by René Sti
 1936: Cœur de gueux by Jean Epstein
 1936: Une gueule en or by Pierre Colombier
 1936: Monsieur Sans-Gêne by Karl Anton
 1936: The New Testament by Sacha Guitry and Alexandre Ryder
 1936: Œil de lynx, détective by Pierre-Jean Ducis
 1936: Pantins d'amour by Walter Kapps
 1936: Passé à vendre by René Pujol
 1936: Les Pattes de mouche by Jean Grémillon
 1936: La Reine des resquilleuses by Max Glass and marco de Gastyne
 1937: Chaste Susanne by André Berthomieu : Pomerel
 1937  Un déjeuner de soleil by Marcel Cravenne
 1937: Hercule by Alexander Esway
 1937:  by Victor Tourjansky
 1937: The Secrets of the Red Sea by Richard Pottier
 1938: Barnabé by Alexander Esway
 1938: Un fichu métier by Pierre-Jean Ducis
 1938: Le Père Lebonnard by Jean de Limur
 1938: Un de la Canebière by René Pujol
 1939: Beating Heart by Henri Decoin
 1941: The Acrobat by Jean Boyer
 1945: Lady on a Train by Charles David
 1946: Amour, Délices et Orgues by André Berthomieu
 1946: Les Beaux Jours du roi Murat by Théophile Pathé
 1946: Le chanteur inconnu by André Cayatte
 1947: La Révoltée by Marcel L'Herbier
 1948: Clochemerle by Pierre Chenal
 1948: Mort ou vif by Jean Tedesco
 1948: Les amants de Vérone by André Cayatte
 1949: My Aunt from Honfleur de René Jayet
 1949: Le Furet de Raymond Leboursier
 1949: Keep an Eye on Amelia by Claude Autant-Lara
 1949: Blonde by Maurice Cam
 1950: Rome-express by Christian Stengel
 1950: Dakota 308 by Jacques Daniel Norman
 1950:  by Émile Couzinet
 1950: Et moi j'te dis qu'elle t'a fait d'l'œil by Maurice Gleize
 1950: Les Maîtres nageurs by Henry Lepage
 1951: Good Enough to Eat by Raoul André
 1951: Chacun son tour by André Berthomieu
 1952: The Call of Destiny by Georges Lacombe
 1952  Ouvert contre X by Richard Pottier
 1952: Innocents in Paris by Gordon Parry
 1953: Le Blé en herbe by Claude Autant-Lara
 1954: Tourments by Jacques Daniel-Norman
 1954: Pas de souris dans le bizness by Henry Lepage
 1954: Le Fils de Caroline Chérie by Jean-Devaivre
 1955: Mon curé champion du régiment by Émile Couzinet
 1956: Sous le ciel de Provence or Quatre pas dans les nuages by Mario Soldati

Theatre 
 1887: La Tosca by Victorien Sardou, Théâtre de la Porte-Saint-Martin 
 1902: Théodora by Victorien Sardou, Théâtre Sarah-Bernhardt 
 1902: La Samaritaine by Edmond Rostand, Théâtre Sarah-Bernhardt 
 1902: L'Aiglon by Edmond Rostand, Théâtre Sarah-Bernhardt 
 1902: Théroigne de Méricourt by Paul Hervieu, théâtre Sarah-Bernhardt 
 1906: Mademoiselle Josette, ma femme by Robert Charvay and Paul Gavault, Théâtre du Gymnase 
 1907: Terre d'épouvante by André de Lorde and Eugène Morel, Théâtre Antoine 
 1908: Le Scandale de Monte-Carlo by Sacha Guitry, théâtre du Gymnase
 1908: Le Passe-partout by Georges Thurner, théâtre du Gymnase 
 1909: La Rampe by André Pascal, Théâtre du Gymnase 
 1909: La Petite Chocolatière by Paul Gavault, Théâtre de la Renaissance 
 1909: Pierre et Thérèse by Marcel Prévost, Yhéâtre du Gymnase 
 1912: L'Idée de Françoise by Paul Gavault, Théâtre de la Renaissance 
 1913: Les Femmes savantes by Molière, directed by Léon Poirier and Henri Beaulieu, Comédie des Champs-Élysées
 1913: Le Veau d'or by Lucien Gleize, directed by Henri Beaulieu, Comédie des Champs-Élysées
 1927: Le Sexe fort by Tristan Bernard, théâtre Michel
 1929: L'Ascension de Virginie by Maurice Donnay and Lucien Descaves, Théâtre de la Michodière
 1929: La Rolls Royce by Mario Duliani and Jean Refroigney, directed by Harry Baur, Théâtre des Mathurins
 1930: Browning by Mario Duliani and Jean Refroigney, Théâtre des Mathurins (+ mise en scène)
 1934: Le Nouveau Testament by Sacha Guitry, directed by the author, Théâtre de la Madeleine
 1949: Les Maîtres Nageurs by Marcel Franck, directed by Émile Dars, Théâtre de la Potinière
 1950: Pourquoi pas moi by Armand Salacrou, directed by Jacques Dumesnil, Théâtre Édouard VII
 1951: Le Sabre de mon père by Roger Vitrac, directed by Pierre Dux, Théâtre de Paris
 1952: Robinson by Jules Supervielle, directed by Jean Le Poulain, Théâtre de l'Œuvre
 1952: Tartempion by Marcel E. Grancher and Frédéric Dard, directed by Pierre Valde, Théâtre des Noctambules

References

Bibliography 

External links 
 
 71 films linked to Charles Dechamps on Ciné-Ressources.net
 Charles Dechamps sur Les Archives du spectacle

1882 births
1959 deaths
French male stage actors
French male film actors
French male silent film actors
20th-century French male actors
Male actors from Paris
Burials at Père Lachaise Cemetery